Sagina (like Colobanthus called "pearlworts") is a genus of 20–30 species of flowering plants in the family Caryophyllaceae. These are flowering herbs native to temperate regions of the Northern Hemisphere extending south to tropical mountain areas at high altitudes, reaching just south of the equator in Africa. They are small annual or perennial herbaceous plants, growing to 5–15 cm. The leaves are opposite, often in tight whorl-like clusters, simple linear, typically 5–20 mm long. The flowers are solitary or in small cymes, with four or five green sepals and an equal number of white petals; the petal size relative to the sepal size is useful in species identification. The fruit is a small capsule containing several seeds.

Species
The following species are accepted by The Plant List:

Sagina abyssinica Hochst. ex A. Rich.
Sagina afroalpina Hedberg
Sagina apetala Ard.
Sagina caespitosa Lange
Sagina chilensis Naudin
Sagina decumbens (Elliott) Torr. & A.Gray
Sagina glabra (Willd.) Fenzl
Sagina graminifolia Wedd.
Sagina humifusa (Cambess.) Fenzl ex Rohrbach in Martius
Sagina japonica (Sw.) Ohwi
Sagina maritima G.Don
Sagina maxima A. Gray
Sagina micropetala Rauschert
Sagina nivalis (Lindblad) Fr.
Sagina nodosa (L.) Fenzl
Sagina × normaniana Lagerh.
Sagina pilifera (DC.) Fenzl
Sagina procumbens L.
Sagina sabuletorum (J.Gay) Lange
Sagina saginoides (L.) H.Karst.
Sagina stridii Kit Tan, Zarkos & Christodoulou
Sagina subulata (Sw.) C.Presl

References

 
Caryophyllaceae genera